Intro5pect is an American political electropunk band from Southern California.

The band were officially formed in 1997 as a reaction to what was an apparent commercialization of the punk genre. Their first demo was released in 1998 and their first official release came in 1999 when newly founded indie label Geykido Comet Records released the band's song Education as a limited edition 7" vinyl.

In 2002 the band signed to Anti-Flag's label A-F Records which released their self-titled full-length album in spring 2003.

In June 2007, Intro5pect toured the United Kingdom and Mainland Europe. Around this time the band's new demo "War At Home" was spot-played several times by BBC Radio 1 DJ Mike Davies on his punk rock show 'The Lockup'.

On October 16, 2007, the EP Realpolitik was released, featuring Stza from Leftöver Crack on vocals.

In Summer 2008, the band embarked on their second tour of the United Kingdom alongside Moral Dilemma and this time played several headline shows at such venues as the Camden Underworld, finishing the tour at White Rabbit in Plymouth with a special rendition of rock and roll featuring Craig Temple of Moral Dilemma on guitar and Joey Blues of Kill Youth Culture on mandolin. Further support came from Mike Davies who this time had the band in to do a live session at the Maida Vale Studios. The show was broadcast the following week on BBC Radio 1.

Upon returning home from this tour, the band and bassist Gregg parted ways due to creative differences. After an extensive search LandonHell was drafted in to fill the void.

In a 2009 interview with PunkCDSampler, Sara declared that "The new album sounds like the self-titled one, to the extreme". The EP Record Profits was released later that Summer.

On February 24, 2019, the band performed for the first time since 2011 at the Observatory in Santa Ana with the addition of new singer Dani. "Pro-Control", the first new track since 2009's "Record Profits", was released on December 6, 2019.

Discography
1999: "Education" 7" 
2003: Self-titled full-length album
2007: Realpolitik!
2009: Record Profits

Compilations
1999: We're Not Generation X
2000: You Call This Music?! Volume 1
2001: Your Machinery Is Too Much for Me 7"
2002: You Call This Music?! Volume 2
2002: Dropping Food on Their Heads Is Not Enough: Benefit for RAWA
2003: Go Kart MP300
2005: This Just In... Benefit for Indy Media
2005: Voices of Discontent
2008: Chemical X DVD (music video compilation)

See also
 A-F Records

External links
Intro5pect on Facebook
GC Records

Punk rock groups from California
Geykido Comet Records
A-F Records artists
Musical groups from Orange County, California
Electropunk musical groups